The 2014 season for the Astana cycling team began in January with the Tour Down Under. As a UCI ProTeam, they were automatically invited and obligated to send a squad to every event in the UCI World Tour.
This season was sponsored by the Samruk-Kazyna group as well as Air Astana, Astana Motors and Expo 2017.

Team roster

Riders who joined the team for the 2014 season

Riders who left the team during or after the 2013 season

Season victories

Footnotes

References

2014 road cycling season by team
Astana Qazaqstan Team
2014 in Kazakhstani sport